Stephen Cabot Williams (born September 21, 1981) is a former professional gridiron football defensive end. He was signed by the Kansas City Chiefs as an undrafted free agent in 2006. He played college football at Northwest Missouri State.

Williams has also been a member of the Carolina Panthers, New England Patriots, and BC Lions.

Early years
Williams attended Bolingbrook High School in Bolingbrook, Illinois, where he earned all-state honors in football and was a state champion in wrestling.

College career
After graduating from Bolingbrook High School, Williams attended Indiana University, where he played in 10 games as a freshman in 2000, recording 10 tackles. In his 2001 sophomore season, Williams had one sack and 17 tackles in 11 games played. He transferred to Northern Illinois University in 2002 but did not play. He returned to play football in 2004 with Northwest Missouri State University, where he was a first-team All-MIAA selection with 52 tackles. In 2005, appeared in five games and recorded 31 tackles.

Professional career

Kansas City Chiefs
After going undrafted in the 2006 NFL Draft, Williams signed with the Kansas City Chiefs on May 17, 2006. He was released by the Chiefs following final cuts on September 2 and re-signed to their practice squad two days later. He was promoted to the Chiefs' 53-man roster on September 28 and released from it on November 16. He returned to the practice squad on November 20 and to the 53-man roster on November 28, where he spent the remainder of the season. He finished the 2006 season with four tackles in 11 games played. He was released by the Chiefs on February 21, 2007.

Carolina Panthers
Williams was signed by the Carolina Panthers on March 16, 2007. He was placed on the team's injured reserve list on September 1, and released from it five days later with an injury settlement. He was re-signed by the Panthers following the season on April 7, 2008. He was again released by the team on August 30, 2008.

New England Patriots
After spending the 2008 season out of football, Williams was signed by the New England Patriots on May 4, 2009. He was waived on September 4, 2009.

BC Lions
Williams signed with the BC Lions of the Canadian Football League on September 22, 2009. After spending parts of two seasons with the club, he was released on January 28, 2011.

Return to New England
The Patriots re-signed Williams on July 29, 2011. He was waived on August 13.

References

External links
New England Patriots bio

1981 births
Living people
Sportspeople from Oak Park, Illinois
Players of American football from Illinois
African-American players of American football
American football defensive tackles
American football defensive ends
Indiana Hoosiers football players
Northern Illinois Huskies football players
Northwest Missouri State Bearcats football players
Kansas City Chiefs players
Carolina Panthers players
New England Patriots players
BC Lions players
21st-century African-American sportspeople
20th-century African-American people